The yellow-spotted agama (Trapelus flavimaculatus) is a common species of agamid lizard endemic to the Middle East.

Geographic range
It is found in arid regions of the Middle East, north of the Eastern Desert and northern Sinai, and the Arabian Peninsula.

Habitat
It inhabits low land desert, particularly sandy areas.

Diet
It feeds mostly on insects.

Behaviour
During extremely hot weather, it may climb on bushes. It is diurnal.

Description
Males are generally known by their remarkable blue colour on the ventral surface of their necks.

References

Further reading
 Rüppell E. 1835. Neue Wirbelthiere zu der Fauna von Abyssinien gehörig. Amphibien. Frankfurt am Main: S. Schmerber. (Trapelus flavimaculatus, p. 12)

Trapelus
Reptiles described in 1835
Taxa named by Eduard Rüppell